Kerrville is a city in, and the county seat of, Kerr County, Texas, United States. The population of Kerrville was 24,278 at the 2020 census. Kerrville is named after James Kerr, a major in the Texas Revolution, and friend of settler-founder Joshua Brown, who settled in the area to start a shingle-making camp.

Being nestled in the hills of Texas Hill Country, Kerrville is best known for its beautiful parks that line the Guadalupe River, which runs directly through the city; other features include its nearby youth summer camps, hunting ranches, and RV parks. It is also the home of Texas' Official State Arts & Crafts Fair, the Kerrville Folk Festival, the Kerrville Triathlon (since 2011), and the Kerrville Renaissance Festival (since 2017), as well as Mooney Aviation Company, James Avery Jewelry, and Schreiner University. The Museum of Western Art (founded 1983) features the work of living artists specializing in the themes of the American West.

History 
Archeological evidence (including burned rock middens, lithic artifacts, and Caddoan pottery pieces) suggests that humans lived in the area known as Kerrville as early as 10,000 years ago. The early modern residents were successful shinglemakers whose mercantile business became a hub that served the middle and upper Hill Country area in the late 1840s. One of the earliest shinglemakers was Joshua D. Brown. With his family, Joshua Brown had led several other families on an exploration of the Guadalupe Valley. These early pioneers organized their settlements near a bluff just north of the Guadalupe River in the eastern half of today's county. The settlement was referred to as "Brownsborough", but after the area was formally platted in 1856 by James Kerr, a major in the Texas Revolution, the settlement was formally known as "Kerrville" and maintained a county seat with Texas.

Starting in 1857, a German master-miller named Christian Dietert and millwright Balthasar Lich started a large grist and saw mill on the bluff. This mill established a permanent source of power and protection from floods, and became the most extensive operation of its kind in the Hill Country area west of New Braunfels and San Antonio. Soon afterwards, Charles A. Schreiner rode Kerrville's newly found popularity by serving Kerrville's mercantile needs. Schreiner established a family-run empire that helped build Kerrville's early prosperity by owning almost all of Kerrville's business sectors, including freighting enterprises, retail, wholesale, banking, ranching, marketing, and brokering operations. Schreiner's elegant downtown home, a Romanesque stone structure at 226 Earl Garrett Street, is the site of the Hill Country Museum in downtown Kerrville.

The Civil War slowed Kerrville's development, but with the start of the Reconstruction era, Kerrville's economic boom and ethnic diversification continued anew as demand grew in San Antonio for lumber, produce, and craftsmen. Kerrville's boom was also catalyzed by the combination of the cessation of Indian raids and the expansion into the business of cattle, sheep, and goat ranching. Cattle drives punctuated the boom-years of the late 1880s and the 1890s. In 1887, the San Antonio and Aransas Pass Railway reached Kerrville, and in 1889 the town incorporated, with an aldermanic form of city government.

The Kerrville Water Works Company began to provide water for town dwellers in 1894. Telephone service was introduced in 1896, and the city began to pave streets in 1912. Kerrville adopted a "commission" form of city government in 1917, then changed to the "city-manager" form in 1928. In 1942, the town adopted a home-rule charter, while continuing with a city manager. Kerrville has displayed steady population growth throughout the 20th century, increasing from 1,423 residents in 1900 to 2,353 in 1920, 5,572 in 1940, 8,901 in 1960, and 15,276 in 1980. Its economic base has diversified and broadened through business, agriculture, light manufacturing, health care, transportation, services, education, the arts, and tourism. By the mid-1990s the Wall Street Journal described Kerrville as one of the wealthiest small towns in America. By 1995, the city's official population was still under 18,000, with another 20,000 people in relatively affluent residential areas south of the river and in the rest of the county. In 2000, the population reached 20,425. Much of the growth in population included retirees and young professionals and semiprofessionals; for many years Kerrville also experienced significant out-migration of young adults raised in the area.

Geography 
Texas State Highway 16 (Sidney Baker Street) is the main road through the center of Kerrville. Highway 16 leads northeast  to Fredericksburg and southwest the same distance to Medina. Texas State Highway 173 leads south  to Bandera, while State Highway 27 leads west  to Ingram and east  to Comfort.

The Guadalupe River runs through the city, with the downtown area sitting on the northeast side.

Climate 
The climate in this area is characterized by hot, humid summers and generally mild to cool winters. According to the Köppen Climate Classification system, Kerrville has a humid subtropical climate, abbreviated "Cfa" on climate maps.

Demographics

2020 census

As of the 2020 United States census, there were 24,278 people, 9,627 households, and 6,059 families residing in the city.

2000 census
As of the census of 2000,  20,425 people, 8,563 households, and 5,411 families resided in the city. The population density was 1,222.5 people per square mile (471.9/km2). The 9,477 housing units averaged 567.2 per square mile (219.0/km2). The racial makeup of the city was 85.89% White, 2.99% African American, 0.55% Native American, 0.57% Asian, 0.08% Pacific Islander, 8.20% from other races, and 1.73% from two or more races. Hispanics or Latinos of any race were 22.73% of the population.

Of the 8,563 households, 8.9% had children under the age of 18 living with them, 49.8% were married couples living together, 10.2% had a female householder with no husband present, and 36.8% were not families. About 33.1% of all households were made up of individuals, and 19.4% had someone living alone who was 65 years of age or older. The average household size was 2.21 and the average family size was 2.79.

In the city, the population was distributed as 21.0% under the age of 18, 8.0% from 18 to 24, 21.3% from 25 to 44, 20.4% from 45 to 64, and 29.3% who were 65 years of age or older. The median age was 45 years. For every 100 females, there were 87 males. For every 100 females age 18 and over, there were 83.0 males.

The median income for a household in the city was $32,085, and for a family was $38,979. Males had a median income of $27,555 versus $19,923 for females. The per capita income for the city was $20,193. About 11.7% of families and 15.6% of the population were below the poverty line, including 25.8% of those under age 18 and 7.8% of those age 65 or over.

Culture 
The Kerrville Folk Festival is an annual summer festival which features folk musicians from around the country and Canada.

Infrastructure

Nonprofit/service organizations 
The TaxExemptWorld.com website, which compiles Internal Revenue Service data, reported that in 2013, 465 distinct, active, tax exempt/nonprofit organizations in Kerrville, excluding credit unions, had a total income of $414.4 million and assets of $958.8 million. One example of a performing arts nonprofit organization in Kerrville would be Art 2 Heart. There are Seventy-three (73) churches in or near Kerrville, Texas.

Transportation

Interstate highways 
  I-10

State highways 
  SH 16 (Medina Highway, Sidney Baker Highway, Fredericksburg Road)
  SH 27 (Junction Highway, Main Street, Broadway Avenue)
  SH 173 (Bandera Highway)

Loops

Farm-to-Market roads

Bicycle routes 
Adventure Cycling Association Southern Tier Bicycle Route

Events 
Kerrville is home to the annual Texas State Arts and Crafts Fair, which features artisans and entertainers from around the state. The Texas Lions Camp and Echo Hill Ranch Summer Camp are also located in Kerrville.

Kerrville hosted the Olympic trials for shooting sports for the 2012 Summer Olympics at the Hill Country Shooting Center.

Education 

Kerrville is served by the Kerrville Independent School District, which maintains four elementary schools (Tally, Nimitz, Starkey, and Daniels), two middle schools (BT Wilson 6th Grade and Peterson), and two high schools (Hill Country High School and Kerrville (TX) Tivy). Our Lady of the Hills Catholic High School and Notre Dame Catholic School and Grace Academy of Kerrville are also located in Kerrville, serving as the primary alternative to the public school system.

Kerrville is home to Schreiner University, a private four-year university which was established in 1923 by an ex-Texas Ranger, Captain Charles Schreiner. The school is consistently listed as one of the top regional liberal arts colleges in the Western U.S. by U.S. News & World Reports America's Best Colleges Guide.

Schreiner University is also home to Greystone Preparatory School. Greystone offers a one-year preparatory course to help individuals prepare for an appointment to one of the five federal service academies.

Notable people

Sports 
 Mike Dyal, pro football player from 1989 to 1993
 Tony Lorick, running back for the Baltimore Colts and New Orleans Saints, inducted into the Arizona State Hall of Fame
 John Mahaffey, pro golfer who won the 1978 PGA Championship
 Johnny Manziel, football player; 2012 Heisman Trophy winner
 Gary Phillips, NBA player for the Boston Celtics (won NBA championship 1960) and Golden State Warriors, NCAA 1st team All American, University of Houston
 John Teltschik, pro football player for the Philadelphia Eagles from 1986 to 1990

Entertainment 
 Thomas Haden Church, actor (George of the Jungle, Sideways, Spider-Man 3, Heaven Is for Real)
 Robert Earl Keen, singer and songwriter
 Ace Reid, artist and humorist, lived in Kerrville from the early 1950s until his death in 1991
 Jimmie Rodgers, the "Father of Country Music"; called Kerrville home for his family when he moved them there in 1929
 Stacy Sutherland, guitarist for The 13th Floor Elevators, buried in Center Point Cemetery
 Alexandra Underwood, Wilhelmina model and contestant of America's Next Top Model
 John Ike Walton, drummer for the 13th Floor Elevators

Business 
 James Avery, owner of James Avery Jewelers (founded in 1954)
 Lloyd Donald Brinkman, owner of floor covering distributor, Brangus cattle breeder, and collector of Western art
 Florence Butt, founder of H-E-B grocery stores in 1905

Others 
 Konni Burton, Republican member of the Texas State Senate from Tarrant County; born in Kerrville in 1963
 Kinky Friedman, Texas musician, politician, and iconoclast
 Jesse Edward Grinstead, author of Western fiction and founding owner and editor of The Kerrville Mountain Sun and one-time mayor of Kerrville
 Harvey Hilderbran, Republican state representative from Kerr County, 1989–2015; defeated for state comptroller in 2014 Republican primary election
 Fleet Admiral Chester W. Nimitz, lived in Kerrville from about age six until his admission to the Naval Academy while in his senior year at Tivy High School
 James E. Nugent, former Kerr County attorney and former member of the Texas House of Representatives and Texas Railroad Commission
 Lou Halsell Rodenberger, Texas author; lived in Kerrville in the 1940s when she was a journalist for the Kerrville Times
 Charles Schreiner III, rancher and businessman who in 1964 founded the Texas Longhorn Breeders Association of America; grandson of Charles Schreiner

Points of interest 

 Kerrville Folk Festival
 Kerrville Kroc Center
 Kerrville-Schreiner Park
 Mountaineer Baseball Field
 Museum of Western Art
 Riverside Nature Center
 Capt. Charles Schreiner Mansion
 Schreiner University

References

External links 

 Official website
 
 Kerrville/Kerr County Local Government Wiki
 A collection of historic Kerrville/Kerr County photos

 
1856 establishments in Texas
Cities in Kerr County, Texas
Cities in Texas
County seats in Texas
Micropolitan areas of Texas
Populated places established in 1856
Populated places on the Guadalupe River (Texas)